The Epistolae Vagantes is a collection of the letters of Pope Gregory VII not included in his register.

The collection was edited by H. E. J. Cowdrey in 1972, and printed by the Clarendon Press, in the Oxford Medieval Series. Each of Gregory's Latin letters is accompanied by an English translation by Cowdrey, whose painstaking work on the edition significantly contributed to the advancement of his career and the modern understanding of religion in the Middle Ages.

See also
 Ephraim Emerton

References

External links
 Epistolae vagantes - Wikisource Original Latin Text in Wikisource
 Epistolae vagantes: text - IntraText CT
 SS Gregorius VII - Epistolae Vagantes [1073-1085] Full Text at Documenta Catholica Omnia
 Trove
 Oxford Medieval Texts: The Epistolae Vagantes of Pope Gregory VII

Pope Gregory VII
Medieval letter collections
Medieval Latin texts